New Zealand competed at the 2004 Summer Paralympics in Athens, Greece. The team included 36 athletes, 28 men and 8 women. Competitors from New Zealand won ten medals, including 6 gold, 1 silver and 3 bronze to finish 36th in the medal table.

Medalists

Sports

Athletics

Men's track

Men's field

Women's track

Boccia

Individuals

Mixed pairs/teams

Cycling

Men's road

Men's track

Women's road

Women's track

Equestrian

Powerlifting

Men

Shooting

Swimming

Men

Women

Wheelchair rugby
The men's rugby team won a gold medal after defeating Canada in the gold medal match.

Players
Dan Buckingham
Stephen Guthrie
Tim Johnson
Gary McMurray
Bill Oughton
Curtis Palmer
Sholto Taylor
Geremy Tinker
Jai Waite

Tournament

Wheelchair tennis

Men

Women

See also
New Zealand at the Paralympics
New Zealand at the 2004 Summer Olympics

References 

Nations at the 2004 Summer Paralympics
2004
Summer Paralympics